The geology of Montserrat formed from the Pliocene into recent times with five major and three parasitic volcanoes. For the most part, the volcanoes only erupted andesite, pyroclastic flows and dome lavas and the Montserrat series is dominantly calc-alkaline. The only exception is South Soufriere Hill with basalt lava flows and pyroclastic flows.

See also
Soufrière Hills Volcano

References

Geography of Montserrat
Natural history of Montserrat
Montserrat
Montserrat
Montserrat